Hylo is a hamlet in northern Alberta, Canada within Lac La Biche County.

Demographics 
Lac La Biche County's 2016 municipal census counted a population of 31 in Hylo.

See also 
List of communities in Alberta
List of hamlets in Alberta

References 

Hamlets in Alberta
Lac La Biche County